Hedya iophaea is a moth of the family Tortricidae. It is found in Sri Lanka, western Java, eastern Borneo and Taiwan.

The wingspan is 9–12 mm. The anterior part of the forewings is deep purple, with a round white basal spot. The posterior part of the wing is deep crimson. The hindwings are grey fuscous with a golden gloss.

References

Moths described in 1912
Olethreutini
Moths of Japan